Alberto Jarrín Jaramillo (20 April 1900 – 30 August 1981) was an Ecuadorian long-distance runner. He competed in the men's 10,000 metres at the 1924 Summer Olympics.

References

External links
 

1900 births
1981 deaths
Athletes (track and field) at the 1924 Summer Olympics
Ecuadorian male long-distance runners
Olympic athletes of Ecuador
Place of birth missing